Aysun Boyacı (born 1972) is Turkish former women's footballer, national teams coach and high school teacher of physical education.

Boyacı played for the Istanbul-based Dinasruspor in the Turkish Women's League between 1991 and 1996. After graduation in Physical Education with distinction in Football from Marmara University in 1996, she started a career as a teacher for physical education.

In 2005, she was appointed coach for the Turkey women's national football teams by the Turkish Football Federation. She served until 2010 as the coach of the Turkey women's national, the women's U-19, the girls' U-17 team, and technical director of the girls' U-15 team.

Currently, she works as a teacher at the Vocational High School in Kadıköy, Istanbul, and serves as the coach of the school's football team for boys.

References

Living people
1972 births
People from Karadeniz Ereğli
Turkish women's footballers
Marmara University alumni
Turkish schoolteachers
Turkish football managers
Turkey women's national football team managers
Dinarsuspor players
Women's association footballers not categorized by position
Female association football managers